Grande Fratello VIP is the celebrity version of Grande Fratello, the Italian version of the reality television franchise Big Brother.

Format 
Based on the original Dutch version created by Endemol, the show sees a number of "housemates", divided by gender, social backgrounds and geographical locations, locked up together in a house, where the viewing public can watch them twenty-four hours a day, and vote them out of the house as they choose.

The housemates can visit the "confessional" at any time during the day, either to talk to psychologists if they need to, talk to "Big Brother", or to nominate.

The title is inspired by the George Orwell novel Nineteen Eighty-Four. The novel tells of a Big Brother, head of the totalitarian state of Oceania that constantly monitors its inhabitants by camera in an attempt to suppress their free will. The tag line of the novel is "Big Brother is watching you", which inspired the show, as it is Big Brother who now has total control over the situation in the house.

The housemates live in a house 24 hours a day, bugged by numerous cameras and microphones which capture their every move. Every week the housemates participate in tasks that determine their food budget for that week, or could even affect that week's nominations. The overall goal is to be the final surviving housemate and claim the prize fund. A PlayStation game based on this version was released in 2003.

Series details

References

External links 
 Official website
 

 
2016 Italian television series debuts
2010s Italian television series
2020s Italian television series
Italian reality television series
Canale 5 original programming
Italia 1 original programming